Beaune Football Club is a French football club based in Beaune, Côte-d'Or, founded in 1919. Its previous names were Union Sportive Beaunoise, Fils de France, Association des Patronages Laiques de Beaune and Association Sportive Beaunoise.

The club currently plays in the Championnat de France Amateurs 2, the fifth tier of the French football league system, after winning promotion in the 2008–09 season.

References
Official site 

Association football clubs established in 1919
1919 establishments in France
Beaune
Sport in Côte-d'Or
Football clubs in Bourgogne-Franche-Comté